"Till I Collapse" is a song by American rapper Eminem featuring fellow American rapper and singer Nate Dogg, released from his fourth studio album The Eminem Show (2002). Despite never being released as a single, the song has managed to chart numerous times worldwide and is now Eminem's second most streamed song on Spotify, with over 1.5 billion streams, as of December 12, 2022.

Background 

Although it has never been released as a single, it has charted on a few occasions when other Eminem albums have been released. In 2012, it was certified double-platinum by the Recording Industry Association of America for selling 2,000,000 copies in the United States. This was followed by quintuple-platinum in 2018 and octuple-platinum in 2022.

In popular culture
When Eminem's single "Shake That" (also featuring Nate Dogg) was released in 2006, several Eminem songs re-charted that same week, including "Till I Collapse". It charted in the UK at number 192 on April 15, 2006. In 2008, it appeared in HBO's series De La Hoya/Pacquiao 24/7.

In 2009, it was used in an advertisement  for the then-upcoming game Call of Duty: Modern Warfare 2. It raised digital download sales of the song worldwide considerably, but in Britain the song sold so many copies after the ad aired that it re-charted that week (November 21, 2009) at number 73, a new peak. Shane Mosley used this song as an entrance theme with his bout with Floyd Mayweather as did Shane Carwin for his bout against Junior dos Santos. Major League Baseball pitcher Jesse Litsch used the song as his entrance music during the 2011 season. The song has also been used in the credits of the Season 8 premiere of Entourage. It was also used in September 2011 in the trailer and soundtrack for the film Real Steel, and in trailers and TV spots for the Oliver Stone-directed film Savages. During the 2013–14 NBA season, the song was used during the Brooklyn Nets' team introductions. It has been in use for a few years by the Portuguese soccer team Sport Lisboa e Benfica in home matches when the team first enters the field of play to warm up. It also has been prominently used by the Detroit Pistons in the 2013-14 home opener and in their playoff match against the Milwaukee Bucks in 2019

Charts

Certifications

!colspan="3"|Streaming
|-

References

2002 songs
Eminem songs
Nate Dogg songs
Songs written by Eminem
Songs written by Luis Resto (musician)
Songs written by Nate Dogg
Song recordings produced by Eminem
Rap rock songs
American hip hop songs